This article is about events in the year 2022 in Madagascar

Incumbents 

 President: Andry Rajoelina
 Prime Minister: Christian Ntsay

Events 
Ongoing – COVID-19 pandemic in Madagascar; 2021–2022 Madagascar famine; 2022 Africa floods

 18 January – 2022 Antananarivo floods: At least ten people are killed by floods in Antananarivo.

 24 January – Tropical Storm Ana kills 23 people in Madagascar.
 6 February – Cyclone Batsirai, a category 4 cyclone on the Saffir–Simpson scale, kills at least 10 people and displaces more than 48,000 after making landfall in Madagascar.
 8 March – Cyclone Gombe makes landfall in the Sava Region.
 29 August – In Ikongo,18 people are killed and 34 are wounded when police open fire on a group protesting the kidnapping of a child with albinism.

Sports 

 4 – 20 February: Madagascar at the 2022 Winter Olympics
 4 – 14 August: 2022 FIBA U18 African Championship (Host)

See also 

COVID-19 pandemic in Africa
2022–23 South-West Indian Ocean cyclone season
International Organization of Francophone countries (OIF)

References 

 
Madagascar
Madagascar
2020s in Madagascar
Years of the 21st century in Madagascar